Saint-Alyre-d'Arlanc (literally Saint-Alyre of Arlanc; Auvergnat: Sent Alire d'Arlanc) is a commune in the Puy-de-Dôme department in Auvergne in central France.

Geography
It is situated on the D999 road and almost midway between the cities of Clermont-Ferrand and Saint-Étienne at the heart of the Parc naturel régional Livradois-Forez.

The village is surrounded by pine forest with wild mushrooms to be found in the woods during autumn, rolling countryside and it is on the pilgrim trail. 9 km to the south is the mediaeval abbey town of La Chaise-Dieu.

Population
The village has a population of 50 permanent year round residents, which swells to 3-400 during the summer months.

The mayor, elected in 2020, is Olivier Bourron. The annual Fête Patronale is held over the weekend of the third Sunday in July.

See also
Communes of the Puy-de-Dôme department

References

Saintalyredarlanc